Micropterix conjunctella is a species of moth belonging to the family Micropterigidae. It was described by John Heath in 1986, and is endemic to the type locality at Skikda in Algeria.

References

Endemic fauna of Algeria
Micropterigidae
Moths described in 1986
Moths of Africa
Taxa named by John Heath